Mount Lorne-Southern Lakes is an electoral district which returns a member (known as an MLA) to the Legislative Assembly of Yukon in Canada. It was one of the Yukon's eight rural ridings.

The district was first contested in the 2011 election. It was created by merging most of the former districts of Mount Lorne and Southern Lakes. The riding includes the Yukon communities of Carcross, Tagish, Marsh Lake, and Mount Lorne as well part of the traditional territory of the Carcross/Tagish First Nation, the Teslin Tlingit Council, and the Kwanlin Dün First Nation.

Members of the Legislative Assembly

Election results

2021 general election

2016 general election

|-

| Liberal
| John Streicker
| align="right"| 451
| align="right"| 38.5%
| align="right"| +27.9%
|-

| NDP
| Kevin Barr
| align="right"| 437
| align="right"| 37.3%
| align="right"| -9.5%

|-
! align left colspan=3|Total
! align=right| 1172
! align=right| 100.0%
! align=right| –
|}

2011 general election

References

Yukon territorial electoral districts